Perfect commonly refers to:	
 Perfection, completeness, excellence
 Perfect (grammar), a grammatical category in some languages

Perfect may also refer to:

Film
 Perfect (1985 film), a romantic drama
 Perfect (2018 film), a science fiction thriller

Literature
 Perfect (Friend novel), a 2004 novel by Natasha Friend
 Perfect (Hopkins novel), a young adult novel by Ellen Hopkins
 Perfect (Joyce novel), a 2013 novel by Rachel Joyce
 Perfect (Shepard novel), a Pretty Little Liars novel by Sara Shepard
 Perfect, a young adult science fiction novel by Dyan Sheldon

Music 
 Perfect interval, in music theory
 Perfect Records, a record label

Artists
 Perfect (musician) (born 1980), reggae singer
 Perfect (Polish band)
 Perfect (American band), an American alternative rock group

Albums
 Perfect (Intwine album) (2004)
 Perfect (Half Japanese album) (2016)
 perfecT, an album by Sam Shaber
 Perfect, an album by True Faith or its title track
 Perfect, an album by Benny Hester or its title track

EPs
 Perfect (Mannequin Pussy EP) (2021)

Songs
 "Perfect" (Vanessa Amorosi song) (2008)
 "Perfect" (Anne-Marie song) (2018)
 "Perfect" (Darin song) (2006)
 "Perfect" (Sara Evans song) (2003)
 "Perfect" (Fairground Attraction song) (1988)
 "Perfect" (Hedley song) (2010)
 "Perfect (Exceeder)", a 2007 song by Mason and Princess Superstar
 "Perfect" (One Direction song) (2015)
 "Perfect" (PJ & Duncan song) (1995)
 "Perfect" (Princess Superstar song) (2005)
 "Perfect" (Ed Sheeran song) (2017)
 "Perfect" (Simple Plan song) (2003)
 "Perfect" (The Smashing Pumpkins song) (1998)
 "Perfect" (Topic and Ally Brooke song) (2018)
 "Perfect" (Disney song), a song from Disenchanted
 "Fuckin' Perfect" a 2010 song by Pink
 "Perfect", a song by Alexandra Burke from Overcome
 "Perfect", a song by John Cale from blackAcetate
 "Perfect", a song by Depeche Mode from Sounds of the Universe
 "Perfect", a song by Flyleaf from Flyleaf
 "Perfect", a song by Selena Gomez from Revival
 "The Perfect", a song by the Killing Tree from The Romance of Helen Trent
 "Perfect", a song by the Lightning Seeds from Jollification
 "Perfect", a song by Lights from Songs from Instant Star Four
 "Perfect", a song by Marianas Trench from Masterpiece Theatre
 "Perfect", a song by Alanis Morissette from Jagged Little Pill
 "Perfect", a song by Julia Murney from I'm Not Waiting
 "Perfect", a song by Stabbing Westward from Stabbing Westward
 "Perfect", a song by The The

Mathematics 
 Perfect graph
 Perfect group
 Perfect lattice (same as perfect form)
 Perfect matrix
 Perfect number
 Perfect power
 Perfect set

People with the surname
 Chip Perfect, American businessman and politician
 Christine McVie née Perfect (1943–2022), English musician
 Eddie Perfect (born 1977), Australian musician, comedian, writer and actor
 Hazel Perfect (died 2015), British mathematician

Other uses
 Perfect (server framework), for the Swift programming language
 Perfect Developer, a tool for developing computer programs
 Cathar Perfect, a Cathar priest
 Perfect Creek, Ohio, United States
 Perfect, a cocktail containing equal measures of sweet and dry vermouth

See also
 Perfect flower, one having both male and female reproductive structures
 Perfekt (disambiguation)